Patricia M. Clavin,  is a British historian and academic, who specialises in international relations, economic crises, and twentieth-century history. She is Professor of International History at the University of Oxford, and a fellow and tutor in history at Jesus College, Oxford.

Early life and education
Clavin studied Modern History at King's College London, graduating with a Bachelor of Arts (BA) degree and a Doctor of Philosophy (PhD) degree.

Academic career
Before moving to Oxford, Clavin was Reader in Modern History at Keele University. In October 2003, she was elected a Fellow of Jesus College, Oxford and appointed a university lecturer in modern history at the University of Oxford. In 2011, she was granted a Title of Distinction as "Professor of International History".
	
She is a member of the Editorial Board for Past & Present.

Honours
In 2015, Clavin was awarded the British Academy Medal for her book, Securing The World Economy: The Reinvention of the League of Nations 1920-1946; the medals are awarded each year to up to three people "for landmark academic achievement in any of the humanities and social science disciplines supported by the Academy". In July 2016, she was elected a Fellow of the British Academy (FBA), the UK's national academy for the humanities and the social sciences. She is also a Fellow of the Royal Historical Society (FRHistS), and a Foreign Member of the Norwegian Academy of Science and Letters.

Selected works

References

Living people
British women historians
History of international relations
Historians of Europe
Historians of World War I
Historians of World War II
Fellows of the British Academy
Alumni of King's College London
Fellows of Jesus College, Oxford
Academics of Keele University
Fellows of the Royal Historical Society
Members of the Norwegian Academy of Science and Letters
Year of birth missing (living people)
Recipients of the British Academy Medal
Food historians